Leonid Lenny Frédéric Srdić (born 23 January 2002) is a professional footballer who plays as a centre-back for Lugano. Born in Switzerland, he is a youth international for Bosnia and Herzegovina.

Career
A youth product of FC Unterstrass, and Zürich, he moved to Germany with the youth academy of Union Berlin in 2020. He returned to Switzerland with Lugano signing a contract on 27 July 2021. He made his professional debut with Lugano in a 2–1 Swiss Super League loss to Basel on 22 May 2022.

International career
Born in Switzerland, Srdić is of Bosnian descent. He is a youth international for Bosnia having represented the Bosnia and Herzegovina U18s and U19s.

References

External links
 
 

2002 births
Living people
People from Uster
Bosnia and Herzegovina footballers
Bosnia and Herzegovina youth international footballers
Swiss men's footballers
Swiss people of Bosnia and Herzegovina descent
Association football defenders
FC Lugano players
Swiss Super League players
Bosnia and Herzegovina expatriate footballers
Bosnia and Herzegovina expatriate sportspeople in Germany
Swiss expatriate footballers
Swiss expatriate sportspeople in Germany
Expatriate footballers in Germany